Curtea Veche nr. 43 were a Romanian musical band who were active in the mid-1970s.

They formed in 1974 as a trio: Sorin Chifiriuc (guitar), Traian Sasu (drums) and Nicușor Curta (bass). Except for Florin Ochescu, who was a student at the Bucharest Polytechnics Institute, the other three members were students at the Bucharest Music Academy. Later, Curta was replaced by Florin Iordănescu, and Florin Ochescu joined as a guitarist. During the years several member changes took place, the band collaborating also with Mircea Florian, who contributed both music and lyrics.

The band recorded some songs at the state-owned radio studio, and appeared sporadically also on television, for example on Club A.

Records
Imn-Proiect on the collective Electrecord record "Formații românești pop”, vol. II. (1976)

See also
Sorin Chifiriuc

References

Daniela Caraman-Fotea, Florian Lungu, Disco Ghid-Rock, Editura Muzicală, București, 1977
Doru Ionescu, Club A-Muzica tineretii tale, Casa de pariuri literare, 2011, Bucharest
Doru Ionescu, Timpul chitarelor electrice Vol. I, Humanitas Educational, Bucharest, 2005

Romanian rock music groups
Musical groups established in 1974